Jacek Maria Dehnel (born 1 May 1980 in Gdańsk, Poland) is a Polish poet, writer, translator and painter.

Life and work 
He graduated from the Stefan Żeromski High School No. 5 in Gdańsk, where he excelled in Humanities. Dehnel studied at the University of Warsaw's College of Inter-Area Individual Studies In the Humanities and Social Sciences (Polish: Kolegium Międzyobszarowych Indywidualnych Studiów Humanistycznych i Społecznych) and graduated from the Faculty of Polish Language and Literature, where he obtained a Master of Arts (M.A.) degree, writing a thesis on Stanisław Barańczak's translations of Philip Larkin's works.

His first collection of poems was the last book recommended by Polish Nobel Prize Laureate, Czesław Miłosz. Dehnel has published his poems in various literary magazines, including Kwartalnik Artystyczny, Studium, Przegląd Artystyczno-Literacki, Topos, Tytuł, Undergrunt. He also works for an internet literary portal Nieszuflada.

Between September 2006 and July 2009, he was a co-host of cultural programme ŁOSssKOT broadcast on TVP1 (together with musician Tymon Tymański and journalist Maciej Chmiel).

Dehnel has translated poetry of such poets as Osip Mandelshtam, W. H. Auden, Mary Oliver – unpublished, and Philip Larkin, George Szirtes – published. He has also rendered in Polish lyrics for songs by Ástor Piazzolla.

He has been awarded literary prizes that include the Kościelski Award in 2005, the Paszport Polityki in 2007 and the cultural award of the city of Gdańsk Splendor Gedanesis in 2009. He received five nominations for Poland's most prestigious literary prize – the Nike Award: Balzakian (2009), Ekran kontrolny (2010), Saturn (2012); Matka Makryna (2015) and Krivoklat (2017) as well as two nominations for the Angelus Award for Lala (2007) and Saturn (2012) and the 2014 Wisława Szymborska Award for his book of poems Języki obce ("Foreign Languages").

In 2015, he was awarded Bronze Medal for Merit to Culture - Gloria Artis.

In 2017, he co-wrote the screenplay to the award-winning experimental animated biographical drama film Loving Vincent about the life of painter Vincent van Gogh, and in particular, the circumstances of his death.

Personal life

He lived and worked in Warsaw, from March 2020 in Berlin. He openly identifies as gay, which is reflected in his literary works. In 2018, he married his long-term partner, translator and historian Piotr Tarczynski, in Wandsworth Town Hall in London. Dehnel and his partner publish works under the female pseudonym Maryla Szymiczkowa. In 2019, he undertook apostasy. Dehnel and Tarczynski left Warsaw for Berlin in 2021.

Books

Prose 
Kolekcja ("The Collection"), (a collection of short stories), Marpress, Gdańsk, 1999 
Rynek w Smyrnie, (a collection of short stories), W.A.B., Warsaw, 2007 
Lala, (a novel), W.A.B., Warsaw, 2006
 Lala. Translated by Antonia Lloyd-Jones. Oneworld Publications, London 2018, 
Balzakiana,(a collection of four mininovels) W.A.B., Warsaw, 2008
Saturn. Czarne obrazy z życia mężczyzn z rodziny Goya, W.A.B., Warsaw (English translation by Antonia Lloyd-Jones, published by Dedalus Books in 2013), 2011
Kosmografia, czyli trzydzieści apokryfów tułaczych, accompanying an exhibition of 15th-century maps in the Warsaw National Library, Biblioteka Narodowa, Warsaw (a collection of short stories), 2012
Młodszy księgowy, (a collection of columns on books and reading), W.A.B., Warsaw, 2013
Matka Makryna ("Mother Makryna"), W.A.B, 2014 
Tajemnica domu Helclów, (co-written with his partner Piotr Tarczyński), Znak literanova, 2015
Dziennik Roku Chrystusowego, W.A.B., 2015
Nowy Tajny Detektyw, NCK and Fundacja Picture Doc, 2015
Proteusz, czyli o przemianach. Spacerownik po historii Muzeum Narodowego w Warszawie, Serenissima, Warsaw, 2015
Krivoklat, Znak, 2016
Rozdarta zasłona, (co-written with Piotr Tarczyński) Społeczny Instytut Wydawniczy Znak, 2016
Mrs Mohr Goes Missing, (co-written with Piotr Tarczyński and translated by Antonia Lloyd Jones) Bloomsbury, 2019

Poetry 
Żywoty równoległe ("The Parallel Lives"), Zielona Sowa, Kraków, 2004
Wyprawa na południe ("An Expedition Southwards"), Teatr Mały w Tychach, Tychy, 2005
Wiersze ("Poems"), Lampa i Iskra Boża, Warsaw, 2006
Brzytwa okamgnienia, Biuro Literackie, Wrocław, 2007
Ekran kontrolny, Biuro Literackie, Wrocław, 2009
Rubryki strat i zysków, Biuro Literackie, Wrocław, 2011
Języki obce ("Foreign Languages"), Biuro Literackie, Wrocław, 2013
Seria w ciemność, Biuro Literackie, Wrocław, 2016
 Najdziwniejsze (The strangest), Wrocław, Biuro Literackie, 2019
 Bruma, Cracow, Wydawnictwo a5, 2022

Translations 

Philip Larkin Zebrane (Collected: The Less Deceived, The Whitsun Weddings and High Windows), Biuro Literackie, Wrocław, 2008
Edmund White Hotel de Dream, Biuro Literackie, Wrocław (with Piotr Tarczyński), 2012
Francis Scott Fitzgerald Wielki Gatsby (The Great Gatsby), Znak, Kraków, 2013

Other 

Six Polish Poets (as a poet and as an editor), 2009. Arc Publications, London.
Il vetro è sottile. Poeti polacchi contemporanei tradotti da poeti (as a poet and editor with Matteo Campagnoli), 2012. Bellinzona, Casagrande.

See also 
Nike Award
Polish literature
List of Polish-language poets

References

External links
Home page
Nieszuflada
Jacek Dehnel at Culture.pl
 
Works of Jacek Dehnel on Polona.pl 

1980 births
Living people
Polish LGBT poets
Polish LGBT painters
Polish gay writers
Polish gay artists
Gay poets
Gay painters
Polish male poets
Polish male painters
Writers from Gdańsk